There Is No Cabal (abbreviated TINC) is a catchphrase and running joke found on Usenet. The journalist Wendy M. Grossman writes that its appearance on the alt.usenet.cabal FAQ reflects conspiracy accusations as old as the Internet itself. The anthropologist Gabriella Coleman writes that the joke reveals "discomfort over the potential for corruption by  meritocratic leaders".

History
The phrase There Is No Cabal was developed to deny the existence of the backbone cabal, which members of the cabal denied. The cabal consisted of operators of major news server newsgroups, allowing them to wield greater control over Usenet.

See also
 Backbone cabal
 Cabal
 Internet meme
 Lumber Cartel

References

External links
 alt.conspiracy.usenet-cabal FAQ on the Cabal and TINC

Usenet
Internet memes
Conspiracy theories
Phrases

fr:Il n'y a pas de cabale